Jared Safier (born December 21, 1982) is a four-time Emmy Award-winning American television and film producer and CEO of Safier Entertainment.

Career
Safier has produced a variety of films including Torch starring Emmy Award, Grammy Award, Academy Award, and Tony Award Winner Rita Moreno; Christmas vs. the Walters starring Shawnee Smith, Dean Winters, 4 Time Emmy Winner & 10 Time Nominee Chris Elliott, 2 Time Oscar & 3 Time Golden Globe Nominee Bruce Dern, 2 Time SAG Award Winner Caroline Aaron, Betsy Beutler, Paris Bravo, Nate Torrence, Jack McGee (actor), 2 Time Golden Globe & 2 Time Emmy Nominee Richard Thomas (actor), John Farley (actor), Christopher Brian Roach, Jaime Zevallos, Joseph D'Onofrio; Senior Entourage starring 5 Time Golden Globe & 7 Time Emmy Winner Ed Asner, Grammy Winner & Golden Globe Nominee Helen Reddy, Golden Globe & 5 Time Emmy Nominee Marion Ross, Oscar Nominated Director Mark Rydell, Oscar Winner, 2 Time Golden Globe Winner & 8 Time Golden Globe Nominee Jamie Lee Curtis and 2 Time SAG Award Winner and 4 Time Emmy Nominee Laverne Cox; and 7 Days to Vegas starring Vincent Van Patten, Ross McCall, Golden Globe Winner Paul Walter Hauser, 2 Time Emmy Winner Eileen Davidson, James Van Patten, Willie Garson, Lucas Bryant, Don Stark, John O'Hurley, Emmy Winner Chad Lowe, Oscar Nominee Jennifer Tilly, James Kyson, Danny Pardo. He has also produced and/or executive produced a variety of action and family films including Altitude with Denise Richards, Dolph Lundgren, Chuck Liddell, and Jonathan Lipnicki; Silencer with Johnny Messner (actor), Chuck Liddell, Tito Ortiz and Danny Trejo; and The Brawler with Zach McGowan, 3 Time SAG Award Winner Taryn Manning, Amy Smart, Emmy Winner Joe Pantoliano, and Oscar Nominee Burt Young as well as many more films and series.

Filmography
 The Dog Who Saved Easter (2014) – Production Manager
 Guardian Angel (2014) – Executive Producer
 Arlo: The Burping Pig (2016) – Executive Producer
 Christmas All Over Again (2016) – Executive Producer
 LIVELove (2017) – Executive Producer
 After School Special (2017) – Producer
 Altitude (2017) – Producer
 Quest: The Truth Always Rises (2017) – Executive Producer
 The Assault (2017) – Executive Producer
 Headgame (2018) – Executive Producer
 Avalanche (2018) – Executive Producer
 Silencer (2018) – Co-Executive Producer
 The Griddle House (2018) – Consulting Producer
 I'd Like to Be Alone Now (2019) - Executive Producer
 The Brawler (2019) – Producer
 Blood Craft (2019) - Executive Producer
 On Thin Ice (2019) - Producer
 You Can't Say No (2019) – Executive Producer
 Rich Boy, Rich Girl (2019) – Executive Producer
 Yes (2019) – Executive Producer
 Ruta Madre (2019) - Executive Producer
 Napoleon: Life of an Outlaw (2019) - Executive Producer
 Segfault (2019) - Producer
 Leo and the Shark (2019) - Executive Producer
 American Christmas (2019) - Producer
 Ghost in the Graveyard (2019) - Executive Producer
 7 Days to Vegas (2019) - Executive Producer
 Fair Market Value (2020) - Executive Producer
 The Serpent (2020) - Producer
 Room 9 (2020) - Producer
 Ovid and the Art of Love (2020) - Executive Producer
 My Senior Year (2020) - Executive Producer
 Penance Lane (2020) - Executive Producer
 Norman (2020) - Executive Producer
 Manipulated (2020) - Executive Producer
 Equal Standard (2020) - Executive Producer
 Mott Haven (2020) - Executive Producer
 The Light Touch (2021) - Executive Producer
 The Wrong Path (2021) - Executive Producer
 My Beautiful Bride (2021) - Executive Producer
 Senior Entourage (2021) - Executive Producer
 Blue Call (2021) - Executive Producer
 Pooling to Paradise (2021) - Executive Producer
 Saving Sloane (2021) - Producer
 Circle of Bones (2021) - Executive Producer
 Christmas vs. the Walters (2021) - Producer
 Torch (2021) - Producer
 Little Ukraine (2022) - Executive Producer
 They Turned Us Into Killers (2022) - Producer
 The Redeemer (2022) - Producer
 Static Codes (2022) - Producer
 Porterville (2022) - Producer
 Camp Pleasant Lake (2022) - Producer
 The Activated Man (2022) - Producer

References

External links

Living people
American television producers
1982 births